The Thémis (PM 41) is a fast patrol vessel of the Directorate of Maritime Affairs based at the Cherbourg Naval Base.

History

Service 
Thémis carries out fishing control and marine environment protection operations in the Exclusive economic zone of France of the Eastern Channel - North Sea maritime zone. She carries out checks to prevent pollution due to exploration or exploitation operations of the seabed or subsoil. It bears the AEM (State Action at Sea) marking on its bow, the three inclined blue, white and red bands.

Present were approximately fifty French fishing boats that came to demonstrate off the British Crown dependency of Jersey against the new fishing licensing conditions imposed by the Government of Jersey in its territorial waters.

See also 
 2021 Jersey dispute

References

Patrol vessels of France
2004 ships
Ships built in France